Lloyd Harbor is a village in the Town of Huntington in Suffolk County, on the North Shore of Long Island, in New York, United States. As of the 2010 census, the village's population was 3,660.

History
In 1654, the Matinecock Native Americans sold  of what is now called Lloyd Neck to English settlers from Oyster Bay. The Matinecock referred to the region as Caumsett ("place by sharp rock"). In 1676, James Lloyd acquired the neck, which was then taken over by his son Henry. Henry Lloyd farmed the land and erected a house, which still survives in Caumsett State Park. After his death in 1763, his son Joseph built the Joseph Lloyd Manor House, which he was forced to abandon by the British during the Revolutionary War. The British built several fortifications in the neck, including Fort Franklin. Henry Lloyd IV was the last Lloyd to own the estate, in 1841. In the 1880s, it became a stop for steamboats coming from New York City, bringing tourists and wealthy New Yorkers.

In 1886, Lloyd's Neck, which was then part of the town of Oyster Bay and had earlier been known as Queens Village, was set off and separated from Queens County and annexed to the town of Huntington in Suffolk County.

The 1900s ushered the era of the Long Island Gold Coast, and various wealthy families began to buy land and build seaside mansions and estates. These included William Matheson, Marshall Field III, Ronald Conklin, Harold Dimppel, Sr., Ferdinand Eberstadt and George McKesson. In 1926, Lloyd Neck and West Neck became incorporated as a municipality which was named Lloyd Harbor.

Robin Gibb, Charles Lindbergh, Jerry Seinfeld and Billy Joel have each lived on the Neck for a time. Currently many of these estates have been adapted for other uses. Marshall Field III's estate is now Caumsett State Historic Park, and the Conklin estate is a Roman Catholic seminary. Others have become a county park and a wildlife refuge. Charles Robertson's estate is now the Banbury Center, a small conference center of Cold Spring Harbor Laboratory.

In 1969 the Long Island Lighting Company proposed locating a nuclear power plant in the community. Local opposition quickly defeated the plan, with Ferdinand Eberstadt donating his  estate to the U.S. Fish and Wildlife Service to become Target Rock National Wildlife Refuge.

Geography

Demographics

As of the census of 2000, there were 3,675 people, 1,147 households, and 1,036 families residing in the village. The population density was 392.9 people per square mile (151.8/km2). There were 1,188 housing units at an average density of 127.0 per square mile (49.1/km2). The racial makeup of the village was 96.49% White, 0.63% African American, 0.05% Native American, 1.88% Asian, 0.22% from other races, and 0.73% from two or more races. Hispanic or Latino of any race were 2.31% of the population.

There were 1,147 households, out of which 46.4% had children under the age of 18 living with them, 85.0% were married couples living together, 3.5% had a female householder with no husband present, and 9.6% were non-families. 8.0% of all households were made up of individuals, and 4.2% had someone living alone who was 65 years of age or older. The average household size was 3.17 and the average family size was 3.33.

In the village, the population was spread out, with 31.3% under the age of 18, 4.1% from 18 to 24, 21.6% from 25 to 44, 30.8% from 45 to 64, and 12.2% who were 65 years of age or older. The median age was 41 years. For every 100 females, there were 98.0 males. For every 100 females age 18 and over, there were 98.0 males.

The median income for a household in the village was $380,411, and the median income for a family was $596,650. Males had a median income of $500,000 versus $41,167 for females. The per capita income for the village was $76,696. About 1.0% of families and 1.3% of the population were below the poverty line, including 0.4% of those under age 18 and 2.2% of those age 65 or over.

Education 
Lloyd Harbor is located entirely within the boundaries of (and is thus served by) the Cold Spring Harbor Central School District. As such, all children who reside within the village and attend public schools go to Cold Spring Harbor's schools.

Notable people

 Dee Snider, singer for Twisted Sister
 Christie Brinkley, model
 Taylor Dayne, singer
 Robin Gibb, singer
 Billy Joel, singer and songwriter
 Angelina Jolie, actress
 Sean Hannity, political commentator
 Marshall Field III, department store heir
 John Phillips, singer, songwriter and member of Mamas and Papas
 Bijou Phillips, actress and model
 Jerry Seinfeld, comedian, actor, writer and producer

References

External links

 Village of Lloyd Harbor official website
 Pictures and info on Lloyd Harbor's historic estates

Huntington, New York
Villages in New York (state)
Long Island Sound
Villages in Suffolk County, New York
Populated coastal places in New York (state)